Mike Kirkland is the former athletic director and current Head Women's Track & Field Coach at Southwestern College in Winfield, Kansas.

Coaching success
As of 2008, every team he has served as head coach has won its conference championship and 11 of his 12 years as a head coach he has been named KCAC Women's Track Coach of the Year.  His teams have amassed a 393–33 record (.922) and have not lost to a conference team since he took the helm in 1992.  Peers have stated this success is attributed to the consistency of his coaching style.

Personal athletic success
As a student at Southwestern, Kirkland was a National Association of Intercollegiate Athletics Academic All-American, a member of the Southwestern College record-setting 440-yard and 4 x 100 meter relay teams, and competed in the National Championships each of his two seasons at Southwestern.

References

Year of birth missing (living people)
Living people
American track and field coaches
People from Winfield, Kansas
Southwestern Moundbuilders athletic directors